Joseph Keith Dixon (1906–1966) was a New Zealand soil chemist and scientific administrator. He rose to be director of Soil Bureau 1962–1966 and President of the Royal Society of New Zealand (1960–1962).

References

1906 births
1966 deaths
New Zealand soil scientists
Presidents of the Royal Society of New Zealand
New Zealand chemists